The 1969 Major League Baseball (MLB) draft took place prior to the 1969 MLB season. The draft featured future Hall of Famers Bert Blyleven (pick 55) and Dave Winfield (pick 882).

First round selections

The following are the first round picks in the 1969 Major League Baseball draft.

* Did not sign

Other notable selections

* Did not sign

Notes

External links 
Complete draft list from The Baseball Cube database

References 

Major League Baseball draft
Draft